Yoro Airport  is an airport serving the town of Yoro in Yoro Department, Honduras.

The runway is in an open field crossed by unpaved roads and footpaths on the southwest side of the town. There is mountainous terrain north and immediately south of the runway.

See also

Transport in Honduras
List of airports in Honduras

References

External links
 OpenStreetMap - Yoro
 HERE Maps - Yoro
 OurAirports - Yoro Airport
 

Airports in Honduras